Krishna Grameena Bank was a Regional Rural Bank (RRB) established under 1976 Act for Regional Rural Banks, was a Scheduled Rural Bank owned by SBI (35%), Government of India (50%) and Government of Karnataka (15%), working as per instructions of the Reserve Bank and carries out multiple types of transactions in banking business. The Bank was operating in Kalaburagi, Bidar and Yadgir districts of Karnataka, and was headquartered at Kalaburagi.

RRBs were setup specially to cater to the basic banking needs of rural people, to enhance rural economy and development of the rural areas and to ensure the employment for the people from Rural sector. Alike Public Sector Banks, RRBs are established by GOI and are also the Scheduled Banks, since they work as per the rules of the Reserve Bank.

Krishna Grameena Bank had 119 branches, out of which 94 were in rural areas and bagged Third Prize from National Bank for Agriculture and Rural Development for fulfilling the guidelines of NABARD under SHG Bank Linkage Program in Karnataka state (2005/2006). Krishna Grameena Bank was one among the two Regional Rural Banks in India, picked by NABARD for execution of Pilot basis Smart Cards, where Micro-Processor Cards were used by members of SHG to check the account balances in their Savings bank account and to withdraw cash from their respective Savings bank accounts avoiding the intervention of the Bank staff or Rural Devel Officer.

Krishna Grameena Bank was established with Head Office at Kalaburagi on 1 December 1978.

It was merged with Pragathi Gramin Bank to form Pragathi Krishna Gramin Bank on 23 August 2013.

See also 
 Indian banking
 List of banks in India
 Kaveri Grameena Bank
 Pragathi Krishna Gramin Bank
 Karnataka Gramin Bank

References

External links 

 Official Website

Regional rural banks of India
Banks based in Karnataka
Companies based in Kalaburagi
Banks established in 1978
Indian companies established in 1978
1978 establishments in Karnataka
Banks disestablished in 2013
Indian companies disestablished in 2013
2013 disestablishments in Karnataka